Benjamin Phillips (born 9 June 1960) is an English football manager and former professional player who played as a right-back. He played in the Football League for Bury. He is currently manager of Radcliffe Borough of the Northern Premier League Division One North.

Playing career
Phillips was a junior with Blackpool, Manchester City and Preston North End before joining Macclesfield Town.

He joined Bury in September 1980. He played 14 times that season and was linked with a move to Bolton Wanderers that fell through due to a pelvic injury, but was released and joined Stalybridge Celtic after a brief spell with Crewe Alexandra. He joined Mossley in August 1982 and was voted the supporters' player of the year the following season. He remained a regular the following season until leaving to join Witton Albion following the departure of manager Bob Murphy from the club in December 1983.

He subsequently played for Winsford United, Barrow, Buxton and Rossendale United before rejoining Mossley in November 1990. He left to join Curzon Ashton early in the 1991–92 season, later playing for Droylsden.

Coaching and managerial career
Phillips was assistant manager at Stalybridge Celtic, Congleton Town and Ashton United and managed coached Mid-Cheshire League sides Grove United and Bramhall before taking over as manager of Mossley in July 1997. He left in November 2001 to take over as manager of Witton Albion, resigning in August 2003 after Albion had lost their first three games of the season.

He was later assistant manager of Leek Town (from May 2004 until May 2005), Clitheroe (from June 2005) and Witton Albion before taking over as manager of Bradford Park Avenue in March 2007. He was sacked by Bradford in February 2008, despite the team being in the race for promotion.

He was appointed as first-team coach, under manager Steve Burr, of Stalybridge Celtic in June 2009. He was made caretaker manager of Stalybridge Celtic in January 2010 following Steve Burr's departure to take over Conference National side Kidderminster Harriers. He was appointed manager of Radcliffe Borough in February 2011 by chairman Bernard Manning jnr (son of the late comic Bernard Manning).

Away from football, Phillips used to run a bingo club in Hyde, although he sold the club in 2005 and it closed in 2009.

References

1960 births
Living people
People from Hazel Grove
English footballers
Association football defenders
Macclesfield Town F.C. players
Bury F.C. players
Stalybridge Celtic F.C. players
Mossley A.F.C. players
Witton Albion F.C. players
Winsford United F.C. players
Barrow A.F.C. players
Buxton F.C. players
Rossendale United F.C. players
Curzon Ashton F.C. players
Droylsden F.C. players
Mossley A.F.C. managers
Witton Albion F.C. managers
Bradford (Park Avenue) A.F.C. managers
English Football League players
Crewe Alexandra F.C. players
English football managers